The 1976 West Virginia gubernatorial election took place on November 2, 1976, to elect the governor of West Virginia.

Results

Democratic primary

Republican primary

General election

References

1976
gubernatorial
West Virginia
November 1976 events in the United States